Gordonia namibiensis is a bacterium from the genus Gordonia which has been isolated from soil from Kalahari in Namibia. Gordonia namibiensis metabolises nitrile.

References

External links 
Type strain of Gordonia namibiensis at BacDive -  the Bacterial Diversity Metadatabase

Mycobacteriales
Bacteria described in 2002